The Recollects Convent (Minderbroederskerk) was a monastery of the Recollects order in Antwerp in Belgium. It was the original location of several works by Peter Paul Rubens (Christ on the Cross and The Incredulity of Saint Thomas) and Anthony van Dyck (Deposition). It was also the first home of the Royal Museum of Fine Arts until 1875, when the town council decided to rehouse it in a new purpose-built building.

Burials 
 Nicolaas II Rockox

See also
 List of Catholic churches in Belgium

Sources

Roman Catholic churches in Antwerp
Franciscan monasteries in Belgium
Christian monasteries in Antwerp Province